The Prix de la langue française is chronologically the first grand prix of the literary season in France.

Established in 1986 by the city of Brive-la-Gaillarde in the department of Corrèze, this prize rewards the work of a personality of the literary, artistic or scientific world, which has contributed significantly, through the style of his/her works or his/her action to illustrate the quality and beauty of the French language.

The laureate wins 10000 euros.

Jury 
The jury of the award, with a rotating presidency, is composed of members of the Académie française, the Académie Goncourt and other writers.

Laureates 

 1986: Jean Tardieu
 1987: Jacqueline de Romilly 
 1988: André Lichnerowicz 
 1989: Michel Jobert
 1990: Yves Berger
 1991: Pascal Quignard
 1992: Alain Bosquet 
 1993: Alain Rey
 1994: Hector Bianciotti 
 1995: not awarded
 1996: René de Obaldia 
 1997: François Weyergans 
 1998: Marcel Schneider 
 1999: Jacques Chessex
 2000: Bernard Pivot 
 2001: Philippe Beaussant 
 2002: Michel Chaillou
 2003: Dominique de Villepin 
 2004: Gilles Lapouge
 2005: Jean-Pierre de Beaumarchais
 2006: Christiane Singer
 2007: Pierre Assouline
 2008: Annie Ernaux
 2009: Jean-Paul Kauffmann
 2010: Alain Veinstein
 2011: Emmanuel Carrère
 2012: Vassilis Alexakis
 2013: Jean Rolin
 2014: Hélène Cixous
 2015: Mona Ozouf
 2016 : Philippe Forest
2017 : Jean-Luc Coatalem
2018 :  Pierre Guyotat
2019 : Louis-Philippe Dalembert
2021 : Pierre Bergounioux
2022 : Nathacha Appanah

References

External links 
 Foire du Livre

French literary awards
Awards established in 1986
1986 establishments in France